Habero Subregion (in Tigrinya: ሓበሮ) is a subregion in the northwestern Anseba region (Zoba Anseba) of Eritrea. Its capital lies at Habero.

References

Subregions of Eritrea

Anseba Region
Subregions of Eritrea